(For God's Sake) Give More Power to the People is the third studio album by American soul group The Chi-Lites, produced and largely written by lead singer Eugene Record. The album was released in 1971 on the Brunswick label.

History
The album includes the hit single "Have You Seen Her", which reached No. 1 on the R&B chart and No. 3 on Billboard Hot 100. It was also successful on the UK Singles Chart, reaching No. 32. The song was later covered by MC Hammer in 1990. The title track, which peaked at No. 26 on the Billboard Hot 100, No. 4 on the RB chart, and No. 32 on the UK Singles Chart, was featured on the soundtrack to the 1995 film Panther. Two other singles, "We Are Neighbors" and "I Want to Pay You Back (For Loving Me)", were released to moderate success. The album was the first of four consecutive Chi-Lites albums to make the R&B top 5, peaking at No. 3. It also reached at No. 12 on the pop chart.

Track listing

Personnel
Marshall Thompson – vocals
Robert "Squirrel" Lester – vocals
Creadel "Red" Jones – vocals
Eugene Record – producer, arranger, vocals
Willie Henderson, Quinton Joseph – directors
Thomas "Tom Tom" Washington, Sonny Sanders – arrangers
Bruce Swedien – recording engineer

Charts

Weekly charts

Singles

References

External links
(For God's Sake) Give More Power to the People at Discogs

1971 albums
The Chi-Lites albums
Brunswick Records albums
Albums produced by Eugene Record